Cannonball is Joseph McElroy's ninth novel.  Set in Southern California and Iraq, it tells the story of Zach, a young and naive military photographer who stumbles upon a secret network of underground water pipes ("horizontal wells") in Iraq used to smuggle what are apparently scrolls containing the original prosperity Gospel, an interview with Jesus peddling free market doctrine.

Plot summary

The novel opens in medias res with Zach photographing a palace that had belonged to Saddam Hussein.  At the palace's swimming pool, he is stunned to see his friend Umo on the diving board.

The novel then backtracks.  Zach, in high school, was on the swim team, coached by his father, a veteran.  Zach had been both a swimmer and a diver until an accident, when he had been interrupted by a shout from his father during a mildly complicated dive, and he gave up diving.  After graduating, in 2002 he was cajoled, almost tricked, into joining the army, and ended up as a photographer specialist.

Umo, about the same age as Zach, is an unschooled homeless illegal immigrant odd-jobber from somewhere in China or Mongolia who seems to know everything important.  Because of his "three hundred and some pound" obesity, he is spectacular at "cannonballs", but surprisingly he turns out to also be a skilled, acrobatic, diver.

While on Operation Scroll Down, Zach arrives at the palace where the Scrolls are due to arrive.  Taking endless numbers of pictures, he is first caught be surprise by Umo's presence, and then more so during Umo's dive, when an explosion destroys the pool.  Climbing into the wreckage to rescue his friend, Zach finds no trace of Umo, but does find a badly wounded military chaplain, the secret piping, and the Scrolls.

Zach tries to explore what appears to be a conspiracy, but he makes very little headway.  Back at home, he has an acquaintance translate the Scrolls, but finds danger closing in on him.  He re-enlists, and at some point testifies on what happened, but fails to solve the mysteries of what happened.

Reception

Preview

Reviews

References

Bibliography

External links
 First chapter McElroy's website

2013 American novels
Novels by Joseph McElroy
Iraq War in fiction
Novels about war photographers
Novels set in California
Postmodern novels